Gerrit Willemsz Horst (1612–1652) was a Dutch Golden Age painter from the Northern Netherlands.

Horst was born in Muiden and became a pupil of Antonie Hendricksz Lust in June 1626. He is also recorded as a pupil of Rembrandt during the years 1635/1640. He died in Amsterdam.

References

1612 births
1652 deaths
Painters from Amsterdam
Dutch Golden Age painters
Dutch male painters
Pupils of Rembrandt